Shearon is a surname. Notable people with the surname include:

John Shearon (1871–1932), American baseball player
Sam Shearon (born 1978), English artist
Thomas Rogers Shearon (1825–1887), American politician

See also
Sharon